Inderjit Singh can refer to:

Indarjit Singh, British journalist and interfaith activist
Inderjit Singh (politician), former member of the Parliament of Singapore
Kunwar Inderjit Singh, former Prime Minister of Nepal
Rao Inderjit Singh, Indian politician
Inderjit Singh Reyat, alleged for the bombing of Air India Flight 182